This is a listing of the publications from Steve Jackson Games and other licensed publishers for the GURPS role-playing game.

Fourth edition

Core books
These are the books necessary to play, with the core rules used in all settings (GURPS Basic Set: Characters and Campaigns), plus basic accessories.

 GURPS Basic Set: Characters

 GURPS Basic Set: Campaigns

 GURPS GM's Screen

Free core books
 GURPS Lite
 A 32-page introduction to the rules of GURPS based on the core rules in the GURPS 4e Basic Set (mainly Characters). It includes basic character creation with advantages, disadvantages, skills and equipment, as well as some rules for playing. It is freely available, as a PDF from the Steve Jackson Games website Warehouse 23. It is a supplement to some GURPS books.
Unlike the 3E version of GURPS Lite, this did not include Magery or any spells, but does include the new "Jumper" Advantage.

 GURPS Ultra-Lite
 Core GURPS rules condensed to a single page. Freely available as a PDF from the Steve Jackson Games website Warehouse 23.

 GURPS Update
 The official conversion guide from 3rd to 4th edition, released as a free PDF file. It is also included in the purchaseable GM's screen.

Rules supplements
These books detail general rules not used in all possible campaign, such as rules for magic spells, for superpowers and for martial arts, and also state-based treatments of cities, military units and other organizations.

 GURPS Boardroom and Curia (PDF) by Matt Rigsby

 GURPS City Stats (PDF) by William H. Stoddard

 GURPS Gun Fu (PDF) by S. A. Fisher, Sean Punch, and Hans-Christian Vortisch

 GURPS Magic
 Magic rules from the Basic set are expanded, detailing a large number of spells, and rules for alternative magic systems, magic item creation, alchemy etc.

 GURPS Martial Arts by Peter Dell'Orto
 Includes new perks, skills, techniques, styles, weapons, and extended combat and injury rules, as well as history on the martial arts, pregenerated NPCs, and ideas for martial-arts campaigns.

 GURPS Mass Combat (PDF), by David Pulver
 Gives rules for large-scale battles between military units, as well as allowing for the actions of player characters.

 GURPS Powers by Sean Punch
 Extends the basic character creation rules to better handle high powered characters, and allow highly detailed customization of powers in which each power consists of a range of abilities (ie, advantages) and a talent, with a "source" and a "focus", adding color and helping to tie together the abilities, and an additional "power modifier" that acts like an enhancement (rare) or limitation to the power as a whole.

 GURPS Social Engineering (PDF) by William H. Stoddard 
 GURPS Social Engineering: Back to School (PDF) by William H. Stoddard
 GURPS Social Engineering: Pulling Rank (PDF) by Sean Punch
 GURPS Social Engineering: Keeping in Contact (PDF) by Kelly Pedersen

 GURPS Tactical Shooting by Hans-Christian Vortisch

 GURPS Thaumatology by Phil Masters 
 Extends further the rules about magic, adding ceremonial, spirit, runic, freeform, material (alchemy, herbalism), and real-world-inspired magic.
 GURPS Thaumatology: Chinese Elemental Powers (PDF) by William H. Stoddard
 GURPS Thaumatology: Magical Styles (PDF) by Sean Punch
 GURPS Magical Styles: Dungeon Magic (PDF) by Sean Punch
 GURPS Magical Styles: Horror Magic (PDF) by Sean Punch
 GURPS Thaumatology: Ritual Path Magic (PDF) by Jason "PK" Levine
 GURPS Thaumatology: Sorcery (PDF) by Jason "PK" Levine
 GURPS Sorcery: Sound Spells (PDF)
 GURPS Thaumatology: Urban Magics (PDF) by William H. Stoddard

Power-Ups
These supplements add a small set of new abilities for characters.
GURPS Power-Ups 1: Imbuements (PDF)
GURPS Power-Ups 2: Perks (PDF)
GURPS Power-Ups 3: Talents (PDF)
GURPS Power-Ups 4: Enhancements (PDF)
GURPS Power-Ups 5: Impulse Buys (PDF)
GURPS Power-Ups 6: Quirks (PDF)
GURPS Power-Ups 7: Wildcards (PDF)
GURPS Power-Ups 8: Limitations (PDF)
GURPS Power-Ups 9: Alternate Attributes (PDF)

Creatures

Aliens
GURPS Aliens: Sparrials (PDF)

Creatures of the Night
These handbooks describe monsters and creatures. All volumes are written by Jason "PK" Levine and Scott Paul Maykrantz; volumes 1-4 illustrated by Scott Paul Maykrantz.
GURPS Creatures of the Night, Volume 1 (PDF)
GURPS Creatures of the Night, Volume 2 (PDF)
GURPS Creatures of the Night, Volume 3 (PDF)
GURPS Creatures of the Night, Volume 4 (PDF)
GURPS Creatures of the Night, Volume 5 (PDF), illustrated by Dan Smith (artist)

Dragons
GURPS Dragons (3rd Edition with 4th Edition appendix) by Phil Masters, illustrated by Alex Fernandez

Fantasy Folk
GURPS Fantasy Folk: Elves (PDF)

Technology and equipment
These handbooks describe the data, in terms of GURPS, of specific objects, gadgets and vehicles, and how to construct new ones.
GURPS Bio-Tech, second edition, by David Pulver and David Morgan-Mar describes medical techniques and enhancements, and modified life forms.
GURPS High-Tech, second edition, by Hans-Christian Vortisch, S.A. Fisher and Michael Hurst, describes technologies from the invention of gunpowder to the present day.
GURPS Low-Tech, second edition, by William H. Stoddard, Matt Riggsby, Peter V. Dell'Orto and Dan Howard
GURPS Ultra-Tech, second edition, by David Pulver describes technologies from the near future onwards.

Spaceships
These handbooks give a streamlined method for spacecraft construction and combat. Volumes 1 through 8 written by David Pulver.

GURPS Spaceships (PDF) - describes the basic design and combat system.
GURPS Spaceships 2: Traders, Liners, and Transports (PDF) - concentrates on the economics of merchant spacecraft.
GURPS Spaceships 3: Warships and Space Pirates (PDF)
GURPS Spaceships 4: Fighters, Carriers, and Mecha (PDF)
GURPS Spaceships 5: Exploration and Colony Spacecraft (PDF)
GURPS Spaceships 6: Mining and Industrial Spacecraft (PDF)
GURPS Spaceships 7: Strange and Alien Spacecraft (PDF)
GURPS Spaceships 8: Transhuman Spacecraft (PDF) - spacecraft taken from the Transhuman Space setting

Genre toolkits
These books describe how to design and play campaigns in a particular genre, such as fantasy, science fiction or detective fiction.
 - This toolkit covers creation of different types of fantasy settings include "High" and "Low", "Dark" and "Light", Swords and Sorcery, and Myth; it also covers typical fantasy races and non-standard settings, such as "Roma Arcana", based on a fantastical Rome that never completely fell. It was a nominee at the 2005 Origins Award for Best Roleplaying Game.
 Provides time-tested advice on running horror campaigns including current trends and tropes, showing how to run everything from old-fashioned Gothic and supernatural horror to the latest J-horror, survival horror, and torture horror. 
 - A PDF file and POD release about detective fiction based adventures and campaigns, crime scenes, and advanced rules for interrogating NPCs.
 - Covers the planning and running of science fiction campaigns with special emphasis on the creation of star systems, worlds and alien races.
 - Builds on GURPS Powers to describe powers, rules, and guidelines to run a superhero campaign.
 GURPS Steampunk
 These genre sourcebooks are all written by Phil Masters:
GURPS Steampunk 1: Settings and Style (PDF) 
GURPS Steampunk 2: Steam and Shellfire (PDF)
GURPS Steampunk 3: Soldiers and Scientists (PDF)
GURPS Steampunk Setting: The Broken Clockwork World (PDF)
GURPS Vehicles: Steampunk Conveyances (PDF)

Hot Spots and Locations

Hot Spots
These largely generic historical setting books are written by Matt Riggsby.
 GURPS Hot Spots: Constantinople, 527-1204 A.D (PDF)
 GURPS Hot Spots: Renaissance Florence (PDF)
 GURPS Hot Spots: Renaissance Venice (PDF)
 GURPS Hot Spots: The Silk Road (PDF)

Locations
Gurps Locations is a series of 5 sourcebooks:
Hellsgate
Metro of Madness
St. George's Cathedral
The Tower of Octavius
Worminghall

Original fictional settings
These supplements details how to design and play campaigns set in particular fictional settings, either specific to GURPS (such as "Banestorm", a fantasy setting, or "Infinite Worlds", about exploration of parallel universes) or independent of it (such as ;the Star Trek universe).

Infinite Worlds
 GURPS Infinite Worlds 
Winner of the 2005 Origins Award for Best Roleplaying Supplement. 
 GURPS Infinite Worlds: Britannica-6 (PDF) by Phil Masters
 GURPS Infinite Worlds: Collegio Januari (PDF) by Kenneth Hite
 GURPS Infinite Worlds: Lost Worlds (PDF) by Kenneth Hite
 GURPS Infinite Worlds: Worlds of Horror (PDF) by Kenneth Hite

Transhuman Space
 Changing Times (PDF) updates the rules for compatibility with GURPS 4th edition. The following supplements are 4th edition-compatible:
 Transhuman Space: Bioroid Bazaar (PDF) 
 Transhuman Space: Cities on the Edge (PDF) 
 Transhuman Space: Martial Arts 2100 (PDF)
 Transhuman Space: Personnel Files 2-5 (PDF)
 Transhuman Space: Shell-Tech (PDF)
 GURPS Spaceships 8: Transhuman Spacecraft (PDF)
 Transhuman Space: Transhuman Mysteries (PDF)
 Transhuman Space: Wings of the Rising Sun (PDF)

Other original settings
,  Details a fantasy setting called Yrth in which standard fantasy tropes such as Wizards, Orcs, Elves, Dwarves are present, along with more unusual fantastic races like the Reptile Men. A basic premise of the setting is that magical banestorms pick up people, whole villages, etc. from other worlds (including Earth) and deposit them on Yrth.
GURPS Banestorm: Abydos by David Pulver
 GURPS Horror: The Madness Dossier (PDF) by Kenneth Hite
 GURPS Lands Out of Time (PDF) by Lizard - A setting that pits man against dinosaur.
 GURPS Martial Arts: Gladiators (PDF) by Volker Bach and Peter Dell'Orto
 GURPS Thaumatology: Age of Gold (PDF) by Phil Masters
 GURPS Thaumatology: Alchemical Baroque (PDF) by Phil Masters
GURPS Zombies, a post-apocalypse world book first printed December 2013
GURPS Zombies: Day One first printed April 2015

Licensed fictional settings
GURPS Casey and Andy (PDF) - A setting inspired by the Casey and Andy webcomic by Andy Weir.
GURPS Prime Directive 
 One of  the incarnations of the Prime Directive role-playing game, set in the Star Trek-derived Star Fleet Universe, together with its sourcebooks:
GURPS Prime Directive: Klingons
GURPS Prime Directive: Romulans
GURPS Tales of the Solar Patrol (PDF) by "Lizard"
GURPS Traveller: Interstellar Wars 
Describes a period of the history of the science fiction Traveller setting, early in its history; includes rules for generating characters for the setting, starship design, interstellar trade, exploration, and ship-to-ship combat. 
Girl Genius RPG (in production), based on the Girl Genius webcomic by Studio Foglio
 Vorkosigan Saga Sourcebook and Roleplaying Game 
the sourcebook of Lois McMaster Bujold's Vorkosigan Saga.

Action
These supplements describe how to reduce GURPS to the essential abilities and rules you need to play in games inspired by action movies of the 1980s and beyond.
GURPS Action 1: Heroes (PDF)
GURPS Action 2: Exploits (PDF)
GURPS Action 3: Furious Fists (PDF)
GURPS Action 4: Specialists (PDF)
GURPS Action 5: Dictionary of Danger (PDF)
GURPS Action 6: Tricked-Out Rides (PDF)
GURPS Action 7: Mercenaries (PDF)

Monster Hunters
These handbooks describe how to reduce GURPS Fourth Edition to the essential abilities and rules needed to play in a typical modern "Monster Hunting" type of game. Example settings include Buffy the Vampire Slayer, or Charles Stross's The Laundry series.

GURPS Monster Hunters 1: Champions (PDF)
GURPS Monster Hunters 2: The Mission (PDF)
GURPS Monster Hunters 3: The Enemy (PDF)
GURPS Monster Hunters 4: Sidekicks (PDF)
GURPS Monster Hunters 5: Applied Xenology (PDF)
GURPS Monster Hunters 6: Holy Hunters (PDF)
GURPS Monster Hunters Power Ups 1 (PDF)
GURPS Monster Hunters Encounters 1 (PDF)
GURPS Loadouts: Monster Hunters (PDF

Dungeon Fantasy
Steve Jackson Games produces two Dungeon Fantasy lines: GURPS Dungeon Fantasy uses the full GURPS system while the Dungeon Fantasy Roleplaying Game Powered by GURPS uses a modified subset of GURPS rules.

Dungeon Fantasy series
These handbooks describe how to reduce the system to the essential abilities and rules needed to play a typical Medieval Fantasy "dungeon crawl" style game.
GURPS Dungeon Fantasy 1: Adventurers
GURPS Dungeon Fantasy 2: Dungeons
GURPS Dungeon Fantasy 3: The Next Level
GURPS Dungeon Fantasy 4: Sages
GURPS Dungeon Fantasy 5: Allies (PDF)
GURPS Dungeon Fantasy 6: 40 Artifacts (PDF)
GURPS Dungeon Fantasy 7: Clerics (PDF)
GURPS Dungeon Fantasy 8: Treasure Tables (PDF)
GURPS Dungeon Fantasy 9: Summoners (PDF)
GURPS Dungeon Fantasy 10: Taverns (PDF)
GURPS Dungeon Fantasy 11: Power-Ups (PDF)
GURPS Dungeon Fantasy 12: Ninjas (PDF)
GURPS Dungeon Fantasy 13: Loadouts (PDF)
GURPS Dungeon Fantasy 14: Psi (PDF)
GURPS Dungeon Fantasy 15: Henchmen (PDF)
GURPS Dungeon Fantasy 16: Wilderness Adventures (PDF)
GURPS Dungeon Fantasy 17: Guilds (PDF)
GURPS Dungeon Fantasy 18: Power Items (PDF)
GURPS Dungeon Fantasy 19: Incantation Magic (PDF)
GURPS Dungeon Fantasy 20: Slayers (PDF)
GURPS Dungeon Fantasy 21: Megadungeons (PDF)
GURPS Dungeon Fantasy Career Guide (PDF)
GURPS Dungeon Fantasy Adventure 1: Mirror of the Fire Demon (PDF)
GURPS Dungeon Fantasy Adventure 2: Tomb of the Dragon King (PDF)
GURPS Dungeon Fantasy Adventure 3: Deep Night and the Star (PDF)
GURPS Dungeon Fantasy Denizens: Barbarians (PDF)
GURPS Dungeon Fantasy Denizens: Swashbucklers (PDF)
GURPS Dungeon Fantasy Encounters 1: The Pagoda of Worlds (PDF)
GURPS Dungeon Fantasy Encounters 2: The Room (PDF)
GURPS Dungeon Fantasy Encounters 3: The Carnival of Madness (PDF)
GURPS Dungeon Fantasy Settings 1: Caverntown (PDF)
GURPS Dungeon Fantasy Settings 2: Cold Shard Mountains (PDF)
GURPS Dungeon Fantasy Monsters 1 (PDF)
GURPS Dungeon Fantasy Monsters 2: Icky Goo (PDF)
GURPS Dungeon Fantasy Monsters 3: Born of Myth & Magic  (PDF)
GURPS Dungeon Fantasy Monsters 4: Dragons (PDF)
GURPS Dungeon Fantasy Treasures 1: Glittering Prizes (PDF)
GURPS Dungeon Fantasy Treasures 2: Epic Treasures (PDF)
GURPS Dungeon Fantasy Treasures 3: Artifacts of Felltower (PDF)
GURPS Dungeon Fantasy Treasures 4: Mixed Blessings (PDF)
GURPS Fantasy-Tech 2: Weapons of Fantasy (PDF)
GURPS Magical Styles: Dungeon Magic (PDF)
GURPS Pyramid Dungeon Collection (for GURPS Dungeon Fantasy and GURPS Fourth Edition)

Dungeon Fantasy Roleplaying Game
Dungeon Fantasy Roleplaying Game Set Powered by GURPS. A boxed set with five books, two maps, cardboard figures, and dice.
Adventurers
Dungeon: I Smell a Rat
Exploits
Monsters
Spells
Dungeon Fantasy Companion 1 (compiles three stretch goals from the DFRPG Kickstarter)
Dungeon Fantasy Dungeon: Against the Rat-Men
Dungeon Fantasy Magic Items
Dungeon Fantasy Traps
Dungeon Fantasy Companion 2
Dungeon Fantasy Dungeon Planner
Dungeon Fantasy Fantastic Dungeon Grappling (produced by Gaming Ballistic LLC)
Dungeon Fantasy GM Screen
Dungeon Fantasy Magic Items 2
Dungeon Fantasy Monsters 2

Norðlond Sagas
A Viking-inspired setting produced by Gaming Ballistic LLC for the Dungeon Fantasy Roleplaying Game.
Hall of Judgement
The Citadel at Norðvörn
The Dragons of Rosgarth
Forest's End
Norðlondr Fólk
Hand of Asgard
The Crypt of Krysuvik

Other free books for 4th Edition
There is a total of 28 free GURPS products given out as no-cost PDFs, in addition to the three above and one below, this includes:
Infinite Worlds I.S.T.
Magic Spell Charts released 15 February 2006
Range Ruler
Skill Categories released 24 June 2005
Alphabet Arcane: Lost Serifs
Combat Cards
Lite Chinese
Lite Interlingua
Lite Italian
Lite Korean
Lite Lithuanian
Lite Portuguese
Martial Arts Techniques Cheat Sheet
Space: Planetary Record and Worksheet
Caravan to Ein Arris
Caravan to Ein Arris 4th
Transhuman Space: Teralogos News - 2100, Fourth Quarter
Transhuman Space: Teralogos News - 2101, First Quarter
Transhuman Space: Teralogos News - 2101, Second Quarter
Transhuman Space: Teralogos News - 2101, Third Quarter
Traveller: Flare Star
In Nomine: A Very Nybbas Christmas
Traveller Interstellar Wars Combat Counters
Temple of the Lost Gods PDQ Conversion
Advantages: A Compendium of Pregenerated Abilities (A PDF of Player Generated Advantages)

Third edition

Core books
GURPS Basic Set, Third Edition, winner of the 1988 Origins Award for Best Roleplaying Rules.
GURPS Basic Set, Third Edition (Revised)
GURPS Compendium I
GURPS Compendium II
GURPS Lite (still offered for free as PDF on site, and in store)
GURPS Lite for Transhuman Space is also distributed freely, a copy of pages 207-238 is distributed as a free PDF.

Rules supplements
GURPS All-Star Jam 2004
GURPS Best Of Pyramid 1 - First selection of articles from online gaming magazine Pyramid.
GURPS Best Of Pyramid 2
GURPS Grimoire - A companion volume for GURPS Magic, describing hundreds of spells and two new Colleges, Gates and Techs.
GURPS Magic (for GURPS 3e)
GURPS Martial Arts (for GURPS 3e)
GURPS Players' Book (1988)

Characters and antagonists
GURPS Aliens, a collection of alien races.
GURPS Fantasy Folk, a collection of fantasy races.
GURPS Monsters, a collection of 48 monstrous characters including Tiamat, Bigfoot, Dracula, and original creations
GURPS Rogues, a book of templates 
GURPS Supporting Cast
GURPS Villains
GURPS Warriors, a book of templates
GURPS Who's Who 1, a collection of 52 historical characters including Aristotle, Aaron Burr, Julius Caesar, William Shakespeare, and Nikola Tesla
GURPS Who's Who 2, a collection of 56 more historical characters
GURPS Wizards, a book of templates

Creatures
GURPS Blood Types, containing biographies and gaming statistics for 23 vampires and vampire-like beings, and guidelines on creating more for various campaign settings.
, describing original "modern horrors" (such as "Grue Beetles", "Netherpunks" and "Slitherwens").
GURPS Dinosaurs, giving game data for dinosaurs.
GURPS Dragons (3rd Edition with 4th Edition appendix), giving game information and data about dragons, also as player characters.
, giving character templates and campaign settings for adventures involving the Little people.
, describing several fantasy animals and plants.
GURPS Shapeshifters, about creation rules, game environments and sample characters for werewolves, Doppelgängers and other shapeshifters.
GURPS Space Bestiary, describing many fictional extraterrestrial creatures, including silicon-based, crystalline, energy and liquid beings.
GURPS Spirits, published 2001, a guide to fictional spirits from several cultures (angels, demons, djinn, dryads, ghosts etc.), with a possible system of spirit-based magic. This expands upon the Spirit rules from Undead and the Ritual Magic rules from Voodoo.
GURPS Undead, published 1998, a portion on the site describing several kinds of undead creatures (vampires, zombies etc.), with rules to create more and related topics.

Technology and equipment
GURPS Bio-Tech (for the 3e)
GURPS High-Tech (for the 3e)
GURPS Low-Tech (for the 3e) describes technologies and inventions up through the Age of Sail.
GURPS Magic Items 1
GURPS Magic Items 2
GURPS Magic Items 3
GURPS Modern Firepower
GURPS Robots
GURPS Steam-Tech
GURPS Ultra-Tech 1
GURPS Ultra-Tech 2
GURPS Vehicles
GURPS Vehicles Expansion 1
GURPS Vehicles Expansion 2
GURPS Vehicles Lite
GURPS Warehouse 23

Genre toolkits
 - A sourcebook for running campaigns inspired by B-grade science fiction and horror movies of the 1950s.
 - Describes a post-apocalyptic setting also shared by the Car Wars boardgame and the Autoduel computer game in which characters are involved in autoduelling, combat in armed and armored motor vehicles. The sourcebook contains rules for designing vehicles, additional skills used by autoduellist characters, and new technology and social conditions of the world. The setting is extended in an additional set of sourcebooks for the Autoduel world (see below).
 - Pre-generated characters for GURPS Autoduel.
 - Sourcebook with background material and rules for adventure tale in the style of 1920s and 1930s pulp fiction.
 - A sourcebook to create realistic police officer characters and adventures.
GURPS Covert Ops
GURPS Cyberpunk -  "The book that was seized by the US Secret Service"
GURPS Dark Places
GURPS Espionage
GURPS Horror.
GURPS Illuminati, describing the secret societies/conspiracies genre, building on the Illuminati card game, in its turn inspired by Robert Shea and Robert Anton Wilson's The Illuminatus! Trilogy. Winner of the 1992 Origins Award for Best Roleplaying Supplement.
GURPS Mars
GURPS Mecha
GURPS Space (for the 3e), winner of the 1988 Origins Award for Best Roleplaying Supplement.
GURPS Special Ops
GURPS Steampunk, winner of the 2000 Origins Award for Best Roleplaying Supplement.
GURPS Supers
GURPS SWAT
GURPS Time Travel, winner of the 1991 Origins Award for Best Roleplaying Supplement.

History and culture
, background for adventuring set in the late 18th and early 19th centuries, with character write-ups for such celebrities of the era as Catherine the Great (of Russia) and George Washington as well as Napoleon's crowd.
GURPS Arabian Nights
GURPS Atlantis
, Mexico before Cortez.
, fantasy role-playing in the Arthurian genre.
, Once Celts raided, looted, conquered and settled over thousands of miles, leaving red-haired descendants from Ireland to Spain to Poland to Turkey, coming within a sword's width of extinguishing the Roman empire before it was born. They left behind rich and terrible mythos, of head-hunting and of poetry, and, of course, of the Fair Folk, a euphemism in the same vein as the Greeks used when they referred to the Furies as "the kindly ones."
GURPS China
GUPRS Egypt
GURPS Greece
,  describing rules and setting for role-playing in the time of prehistoric man, including a shamanic magic system.
GURPS Imperial Rome, describing the historical background and adventure ideas for roleplaying in ancient Rome, including a parallel universe where Roman Empire survived till today.
GURPS Japan (second edition)
GURPS Middle Ages I,  a sourcebook for running a Middle Ages themed GURPS campaign.
GURPS Old West
GURPS Places of Mystery
GURPS Robin Hood
GURPS Russia
, details for playing in the milieu of the Scarlet Pimpernel books set in 18th century Revolutionary France, by Baroness Orczy.
, detailed 17th century role-play in the swashbuckler genre, with rules for ship combat, fencing, guns, dueling, codes of honor and so forth.
GURPS Timeline, a source book with a timeline for play and many short articles, some of which describe "Lost Continents" and some tales about "Lost Fortunes".
GURPS Vikings

World War II
GURPS WWII - Core Rules.
GURPS WWII: All the King's Men - British and Commonwealth forces.
GURPS WWII: Their Finest Hour - Scenario detailing the Battle of Britain.
GURPS WWII: Dogfaces - United States.
GURPS WWII: Leyte Gulf - Scenario detailing the Battle of Leyte Gulf.
GURPS WWII: Doomed White Eagle - Poland.
GURPS WWII: Grim Legions - Italy.
GURPS WWII: Frozen Hell - Finland.
GURPS WWII: Hand of Steel - Commando forces.
GURPS WWII: Iron Cross - Greater Germany.
GURPS WWII: Michael's Army - Romania.
GURPS WWII: Red Tide - USSR.
GURPS WWII: Return to Honor - France.
GURPS WWII: Weird War II - An alternate setting in which Magic, Super-Science, and the Supernatural are real.
GURPS Weird War II: The Secret of the Gneisenau - Scenario detailing the Gneisenau.
GURPS WWII: Motor Pool - Pre-made WW2-era vehicles using the variant WWII Modular Vehicle Design System from the core rulebook.

Original fictional Settings

Fantasy
GURPS Fantasy

GURPS Fantasy GM's Pack
GURPS Fantasy Tredroy

Horror
GURPS Cabal, a customizable setting depicting a modern-day secret society composed of vampires, lycanthropes and sorcerers who study the underlying principles of magic and visit other planes of existence.
GURPS Cthulhupunk
GURPS Screampunk
GURPS Voodoo: The Shadow War

Space
GURPS Space Atlas
GURPS Space Atlas 2: The Corporate Worlds
GURPS Space Atlas 3: The Confederacy
GURPS Space Atlas 4: Phoenix and Saga Sectors
GURPS Terradyne

Supers
GURPS Aces Abroad
GURPS I.S.T.: International Super Teams
GURPS IST Kingston
GURPS Mixed Doubles, a collection of characters designed to be used with GURPS Supers.
GURPS Super Scum
GURPS Supertemps
GURPS Wild Cards (see below)

Transhuman Space
Bioroid Bazaar (PDF)
Bio-Tech 2100 (PDF)
Broken Dreams
Changing Times (PDF)
Cities on the Edge (PDF)
Deep Beyond
Fifth Wave
High Frontier
In The Well
Martial Arts 2100 (PDF)
Orbital Decay
Personnel Files 1
Personnel Files 2: The Meme Team (PDF)
Personnel Files 3: Wild Justice (PDF)
Personnel Files 4: Martingale Security (PDF)
Personnel Files 5: School Days 2100 (PDF)
Polyhymnia (PDF)
Shell-Tech (PDF)
Singapore Sling (PDF)
Spacecraft of the Solar System
Spaceships 8: Transhuman Spacecraft
Toxic Memes
Transhuman Mysteries (PDF)
Under Pressure
Wings of the Rising Sun (PDF)

Other original fictional settings
—presents six versions of Earth possessing alternate histories to that of our own world, as well as a number of less-detailed settings scattered throughout the book in sidebars: for instance, "Gernsback" is a parallel, inspired by 1930s science fiction adventure stories (it is named for the editor Hugo Gernsback) has as its point of divergence is the marriage of Nikola Tesla to Anne Morgan, daughter of banker and financier J. P. Morgan. Attention is given to the ways in which agents of the Infinity Patrol presented in GURPS Time Travel and their rivals from the mysterious parallel known as "Centrum" attempt to influence the course of history in each parallel; the concept of the conflict between the Infinity Patrol and Centrum across the many parallel Earths was made central to the Fourth Edition of GURPS as the default setting in the Basic Set and in the supplement GURPS Infinite Worlds.
GURPS Alternate Earths 2 presents six more alternate histories, among which that of Centrum, whose point of divergence is the successful crossing of the White Ship, meaning that William Adelin, the sole male heir of King Henry I of England, was never drowned.
GURPS Autoduel (second edition)
GURPS Black Ops, describing a setting that Earth under threat from various alien, supernatural, and other monstrous powers, while the player characters are super-skilled agents of the clandestine agency "the Company", known as "Black Operatives" or "Black Ops"; the setting relies heavily on use of various known or less known urban legends and conspiracy theories.
GURPS Cyberworld
GURPS Goblins, describing an original fantasy setting in a society of goblins in London in the 1830s.
GURPS Illuminati University, detailing a fictional college where absurdity and awful puns are the order of the day; its students range from witches and werewolves to secret agents and space aliens.
GURPS Ogre, a roleplaying version of the post-apocalyptic Ogre wargame
GURPS Reign of Steel, describing a future world conquered by a conspiracy of artificial intelligences, after a robot revolt has concluded with the machines' victory.
, describing a setting and new rules in an alternative modern Earth where magic co-exists with technology. It was based on the premise that the Trinity atomic test ripped a hole in the fabric of space-time, triggering a tornado of magical energy.
GURPS Y2K, detailing some possible scenarios involving the year 2000 problem and other world-changing events.

Licensed fictional settings

Television adaptations
GURPS Prime Directive (see above)
GURPS Prime Directive: Klingons
GURPS Prime Directive: Klingon Gunboat Deckplans
GURPS Prime Directive: Module Prime Alpha
GURPS The Prisoner, detailing the setting of the UK television series The Prisoner.
GURPS Fourth Edition Romulans. Starfleet Battles. Complete Imperial Data File. UPC 6 78554 08404 5. ISBN 1-58564-049-2. Stock 8404. 146 pages. May 2005.

Book adaptations
The following fictional settings are adaptations of preceding fictional works originating in novels:
GURPS Callahan's Crosstime Saloon, a parallel world-themed setting based in a bar/space nexus that was created by Spider Robinson in his Callahan's Crosstime Saloon stories.
—detailing the world in which the adventures of Robert E. Howard's Conan the Barbarian are set.
GURPS Discworld
GURPS Discworld Also
, detailing the world in which the adventures of Hellboy are set.
GURPS Lensman, detailing the setting of the Lensman series, a series of science fiction novels by E. E. Smith.
GURPS New Sun, detailing the setting of The Book of the New Sun, a science fiction novel by Gene Wolfe.
GURPS Planet Krishna, detailing the setting of The Queen of Zamba, a science fiction novel by L. Sprague de Camp.
GURPS Planet of Adventure, describing a distant world populated by many varied alien and half-alien races, set in the world of the Planet of Adventure series of novels by Jack Vance.
GURPS Riverworld, a setting in the fictional world described in the novels of the Riverworld series by Philip José Farmer. This setting is an artificial planet where everyone who lived before a set date in history seems to have been resurrected.
GURPS Uplift, based on the fictional universe envisioned by David Brin in his  Uplift Universe series, where biological uplift of animals has become common.
GURPS War Against the Chtorr, describing additional rules and a game setting based on the War Against the Chtorr science fiction novel series by David Gerrold, which depicts an Earth invaded by an alien ecology.
GURPS Wild Cards, detailing the setting of the science fiction/superhero shared universe Wild Cards
—a setting based on the series of Witch World novels by Andre Norton. Included are a bestiary of Witch World creatures, details on the non-human races, a history and geography of the planet, and a color-based system of magic.

Video game adaptations
GURPS Alpha Centauri, detailing the setting of the Sid Meier's Alpha Centauri computer game.
GURPS Myth, detailing the setting of the Myth computer game.

Traveller
SGG published a set of books designed to allow game play in an alternate timeline of Traveller's Third Imperium science-fiction setting using the GURPS rule system.  
GURPS Traveller: Science Fiction Adventure in the Far Future
GURPS Traveller: Alien Races 1
GURPS Traveller: Alien Races 2
GURPS Traveller: Alien Races 3
GURPS Traveller: Alien Races 4
GURPS Traveller: Behind the Claw
GURPS Traveller: Deck Plan 1 Beowulf-Class Free Trader
GURPS Traveller: Deck Plan 2 Modular Cutter
GURPS Traveller: Deck Plan 3 Empress Marava-Class Far Trader
GURPS Traveller: Deck Plan 4 Assault Cutter
GURPS Traveller: Deck Plan 5 Sulieman-Class Scout/Courier
GURPS Traveller: Deck Plan 6 Dragon-Class System Defense Boat
GURPS Traveller: Droyne Coyn Set
GURPS Traveller: Far Trader
GURPS Traveller: First In
GURPS Traveller: Flare Star PDF
GURPS Traveller: GM's Screen
GURPS Traveller: Ground Forces
GURPS Traveller: Heroes 1 - Bounty Hunters
GURPS Traveller: Humaniti
GURPS Traveller: Interstellar Wars (4e; see above)
GURPS Traveller: Modular Cutter
GURPS Traveller: Nobles
GURPS Traveller: Planetary Survey 1 - Kamsii
GURPS Traveller: Planetary Survey 2 - Denuli
GURPS Traveller: Planetary Survey 3 - Granicus
GURPS Traveller: Planetary Survey 4 - Glisten
GURPS Traveller: Planetary Survey 5 - Tobibak
GURPS Traveller: Planetary Survey 6 - Darkmoon
GURPS Traveller: Psionics Institutes PDF
GURPS Traveller: Rim of Fire
GURPS Traveller: Star Mercs
GURPS Traveller: Starports
GURPS Traveller: Starships
GURPS Traveller: Sword Worlds
Steve Jackson Games also published the Journal of the Travellers' Aid Society, the official magazine of Traveller.

Other RPG system conversions
GURPS Blue Planet

GURPS Castle Falkenstein
GURPS Castle Falkenstein: The Ottoman Empire
GURPS Conspiracy X
GURPS Deadlands
GURPS Deadlands: Hexes
GURPS Deadlands: Varmints
GURPS In Nomine, the GURPS conversion of the In Nomine roleplaying game
GURPS Mage: The Ascension, the GURPS conversion of the Mage: The Ascension roleplaying game
GURPS Prime Directive
GURPS Vampire: The Masquerade, the GURPS conversion of the Vampire: The Masquerade roleplaying game. Winner of the 1993 Origins Award for Best Roleplaying Supplement.
GURPS Vampire Companion
GURPS Werewolf: The Apocalypse, the GURPS conversion of the Werewolf: The Apocalypse roleplaying game

Adventures
GURPS Chaos in Kansas
GURPS Conan and the Queen of the Black Coast
GURPS Conan: Beyond Thunder River
GURPS Conan: Moon of Blood
GURPS Conan: The Wyrmslayer
GURPS Cyberpunk Adventures, winner of the 1992 Origins Award for Best Roleplaying Adventure.
GURPS Deadlands Dime Novel 1: Aces and Eights
GURPS Deadlands Dime Novel 2: Wanted: Undead or Alive
GURPS Deathwish
GURPS Fantasy Adventures
GURPS Flight 13
GURPS For Love of Mother-Not
GURPS Martial Arts Adventures′
GURPS Operation Endgame
GURPS School of Hard Knocks (1989), originally written with support for the Champions 4th edition rules, but these rules were removed from the final printing. They were later published online.
GURPS Space Adventures
GURPS Space: Stardemon
GURPS Supers Adventures
GURPS Time Travel Adventures

First and second editions

Core books
GURPS Basic Set, First Edition: Characters
GURPS Basic Set, First Edition: Campaigns
GURPS Basic Set, Second Edition: Characters
GURPS Basic Set, Second Edition: Campaigns
Man to Man: Fantasy Combat from GURPS, a boardgame of melee combat, using the combat rules from GURPS. Published in 1985, before GURPS.

Rules supplements 
GURPS Fantasy (first edition) introduced the magic system that would be included in the Third Edition Basic Set and expanded in GURPS Magic.

Creatures 
 containing information and statistics for animals, including information to play animals as player character.

Technology and equipment 
GURPS High-Tech (first edition)

Genre toolkits
GURPS Horror (first edition)
GURPS Space (first edition)

History and culture 
GURPS Japan (first edition).

Original settings 
Autoduel (first edition), based on SJG's Car Wars game. Supplements included The AADA Road Atlas and Survival Guides:
AADA Road Atlas Volume 1: The East Coast 
AADA Road Atlas Volume 2: The West Coast
AADA Road Atlas Volume 3: The South
AADA Road Atlas Volume 4: Australia
AADA Road Atlas Volume 5: The Midwest
AADA Road Atlas Volume 6: The Free Oil States
AADA Road Atlas Volume 7: The Mountain West
GURPS Fantasy (first edition) introduces the Yrth setting, which would be the basis for subsequent editions of GURPS Fantasy and later GURPS Banestorm.

Licensed settings 
GURPS Horseclans, detailing the post-apocalyptic future described in the "Horseclans" science fiction series by Robert Adams.
GURPS Humanx, detailing the Humanx Commonwealth, the setting of a series of science fiction novels by Alan Dean Foster.

Adventures
GURPS Bili the Axe - Up Harzburk!, a campaign of solo adventures set in Robert Adams's "Horseclans" universe. The book was printed with a serious error making it virtually impossible to play, and so it was recalled.
GURPS Fantasy Harkwood
GURPS The Old Stone Fort
GURPS Orcslayer
GURPS Space: Unnight
GURPS Zombietown U.S.A.

Japanese products 
Several books were produced in Japanese, mostly by the Japanese company Group SNE, and published by various publishers.
 Translations of GURPS, 3rd (published by Kadokawa Shoten( or )
  - Translation of GURPS Basic Set 3rd edition.
  - Translation of GURPS Magic for 3rd edition.
  - Translation of GURPS Martial Arts for 3rd edition.
  - Translation of GURPS Psionics.
  - Translation of GURPS Cyberpunk.
 Translations of GURPS, 3rd (published by Fujimi Shobo)
  - The translation of GURPS Grimoire.
  - The  for GURPS 3rd edition(published by Kadokawa Shoten).
 Translations of GURPS, 4th (published by Fujimi Shobo)
  - The translation of GURPS Basic Set: Characters for Fourth Edition.
  - The translation of GURPS Basic Set: Campaigns for Fourth Edition.
  - The translation of GURPS Magic for Fourth Edition.
  - Martial arts. The Supplement of GURPS Martial Arts.
  - Comical fantasy and the parody of Sword World RPG.
  - Modern horror. This supplement refers to GURPS Supers for Third Edition.
  - The sequel to GURPS Youma Yakou. This supplement refers to GURPS Supers for Third Edition, GURPS Compendium I and GURPS Compendium II.
  - Crossover of multi-planes
 　- Four original world settings
  - Modern female wrestling
  - Written by Shou Tomono and Group SNE; published by Kadokawa Shoten in 1992; "complete version" and GURPS Yuel published by Fujimi Shobo in 1994. Several novels have been published based upon GURPS Runal, set in a fantasy world strongly influenced from RuneQuest: seven mysterious Moons grant magic power to their worshipers.

Korean products 
The Korean publisher Dayspring Games published the Korean translation of GURPS and at least an original supplement, GURPS Sylfiena, a fantasy setting.
 Translations of GURPS, 3rd edition
 GURPS Gibon Set Gukmunpan: Translation of GURPS Basic Set, 3rd edition.
 GURPS Mabeop: Translation of GURPS Magic for 3rd edition.
 GURPS Muye: Translation of GURPS Martial Arts for 3rd edition.
 GURPS Fantasy: Translation of GURPS Fantasy for 3rd edition.
 GURPS Fantasy Jongjok: Translation of GURPS Fantasy Folk for 3rd edition.
 GURPS Cyberpunk: Translation of GURPS Cyberpunk for 3rd edition.
 Translations of GURPS, 4th edition
 GURPS Gukmun 2-pan Gibon Set: Character Book: Translation of GURPS Basic Set: Characters, 4th edition.
 GURPS Gukmun 2-pan Gibon Set: Campaign Book: Translation of GURPS Basic Set: Campaigns, 4th edition.
 GURPS Gukmun 2-pan Muhansegye: Translation of GURPS Infinite Worlds.
 GURPS Gukmun 2-pan Chosangneungryeok: Translation of GURPS Powers.
 GURPS Gukmun 2-pan Mabeop: Translation of GURPS Magic for 4th edition.
 GURPS Gukmun 2-pan Dungeon Fantasy: Translation and compilation from GURPS Dungeon Fantasy 1 to GURPS Dungeon Fantasy 4.
 GURPS Gukmun 2-pan Muye: Translation of GURPS Martial Arts for 4th edition.
 GURPS Gukmun 2-pan Hunterdeului Bam: Translation and compilation from GURPS Monster Hunters 1 to GURPS Monster Hunters 4.
 GURPS Gukmun 2-pan Churiwa Susa: Translation of GURPS Mysteries.
 GURPS Gukmun 2-pan Sylfiena: The first original GURPS book in Korea. A low-mana fantasy campaign setting on the Earldom of Sylfiena for GURPS, 4th edition.

Brazilian Portuguese products
One of the first translations of GURPS was published in 1991 by the Brazilian publisher . The company produced four editions of GURPS, keeping pace with revisions of the U.S. editions, but errors in the revised fourth edition released in 2015 led to the book being pulled from shelves. In 2017, Devir confirmed it would no longer publish GURPS products in Portuguese.

Beyond the core game, Devir published translations of a number of GURPS sourcebooks and adventures:
 GURPS Artes Marciais Translation of GURPS Martial Arts
 GURPS Conan
 GURPS Cyberpunk
 GURPS Escola de Super-heróis. Translation of GURPS School of Hard Knocks
 GURPS Fantasy
 GURPS Fantasy Tredroy
 GURPS Grimório. Translation of GURPS Grimoire
 GURPS Horror
 GURPS Illuminati
 GURPS Império Romano. Translation of GURPS Imperial Rome
 GURPS Magia. Translation of GURPS Magic
 GURPS Psiquismo. Translation of GURPS Psionics
 GURPS Supers
 GURPS Ultra-Tech
 GURPS Viagem Espacial. Translation of GURPS Space
 GURPS Viagem no Tempo. Translation of GURPS Time Travel.

Devir also produced a series of original adventures and sourcebooks branded as "Mini GURPS".
 Mini GURPS As Cruzadas. A Crusades sourcebook
 Mini GURPS Entradas e Bandeirantes. Entries and Flags, an adventure focused on exploring and conquering Brazil.
 Mini GURPS No coração dos deuses. In the Heart of the Gods, a solo adventure based on the movie 
 Mini GURPS O descobrimento do Brasil. The Discovery of Brazil
 Mini GURPS O resgate de "Retirantes". The Rescue of "Retirantes", an adventure involving the painting  by Candido Portinari
 Mini GURPS Quilombo dos palmares. The Quilombo of Palmares, an adventure surrounding a 1600s maroon colony in Palmares, Brazil.

German products
In Germany,  published a German-language translation of the GURPS core rules, along with translations of several sourcebooks and adventures.

 GURPS Conan
 GURPS Cyberpunk
 GURPS Horror
 GURPS Illuminati
 GURPS Magie. Translation of GURPS Magic
 GURPS Der Medusa-Virus. Translation of the GURPS Cyberpunk Adventures adventure "The Medusa Sanction"
 GURPS Meister der Sphären. Lord of the Spheres, an original multigenre adventure
 GURPS Scheibenwelt. Translation of GURPS Discworld
 GURPS Vampire: Die Maskerade. Translation of GURPS Vampire: The Masquerade
 GURPS Voodoo
 GURPS Wiedergeburt. Translation of the GURPS Space Adventures adventure "Rebirth"
 GURPS Zeitreise. Translation of GURPS Time Travel

References

External links
 The directory of all printed GURPS titles at Steve Jackson Games website.
 A BibTeX archive in progress to archive the bibliographical data for GURPS books.

 
GURPS
GURPS
GURPS
GURPS 1st/2nd edition
GURPS 3rd edition
GURPS 4th edition